Journal of Humanistic Psychology is a peer-reviewed academic journal that publishes papers in the field of Psychology. The journal's editor is Sarah R. Kamens. It has been in publication since 1961  and is currently published by SAGE Publications. Former editors of the journal include Thomas Greening.

Abstracting and indexing 
Journal of Humanistic Psychology is abstracted and indexed in, among other databases:  SCOPUS, and the Social Sciences Citation Index. According to the Journal Citation Reports, its 2020 impact factor is 1.902, and its 5-year impact factor is 1.199 (https://journals.sagepub.com/metrics/jhp).

References

External links 
 

SAGE Publishing academic journals
English-language journals
Quarterly journals
Psychology journals
Publications established in 1961
Psychotherapy journals